Matias Ezequiel Mantilla (born 14 February 1981) is an Argentine footballer.

Mantilla started his career in 2000 with Argentinos Juniors in the Primera Division Argentina. In 2002 the club were relegated, but Mantilla stayed with them until his move to Club Atlético Huracán in 2003. He moved down another division in 2005 to play for Defensores de Belgrano in the Argentine third tier. Mantilla was acquired by Real Salt Lake in 2007 at the same time as fellow Argentines Fabian Espindola and Javier Morales, where he scored one goal in 17 Major League Soccer appearances. He was waived by Real Salt Lake in August 2008, and then signed with Independiente Rivadavia.

References

External links
Guardian statistics

1981 births
Living people
Footballers from Buenos Aires
Argentine footballers
Argentinos Juniors footballers
Club Atlético Huracán footballers
Defensores de Belgrano footballers
Independiente Rivadavia footballers
Real Salt Lake players
Argentine expatriate footballers
Argentine Primera División players
Expatriate soccer players in the United States
Association football defenders
Major League Soccer players